A Man for All Seasons is a 1964 Australian television play. It is an adaptation of the play by Robert Bolt.

It was directed by William Sterling who thought the play was "the finest in construction and conception on the large heroic scale to come out of England since the War. Bolt has captured the seething historical background of the period as well as conceiving magnificent character studies of famous people of the time."

Plot summary

Cast
 Wynn Roberts as Sir Thomas More
 John Gray as The Common Man
 Kevin McBeath as Thomas Cromwell
 Neil Curnow as Robert Rich    
 Hugh Stewart as the Duke of Norfolk    
 Terri Aldred as Alice More   
 Fay Kelton as Margaret More    
 Douglas Kelly as Cardinal Wolsey    
 Terry Norris as King Henry VIII
 Bruce Morton as William Roper
 John Morgan as Chapuys
 Campbell Copelin as Cramner
 Barbara Brandon as a woman
 Laurence Beck as Chapuys' attendant

Production
The play debuted on stage in Australia in 1962 for the Elizabethan Theatre Trust with Robert Speaght as Sir Thomas More.

The show was shot in Melbourne. Sterling elected not to use "fades" in his production.

Reception
The Age said it "translated convincingly on the TV screen" call it a "production which, though not perfect gave glamor to honesty."

The TV critic from the Sydney Morning Herald thought that "the stage devices" of the original play "were all too evident for the good of its TV adaptation", notably the reliance of one set for all the action, and the use of the device of the Common Man, adding "the black and white directness of television demands less pageant-like solemnity. But it was able to assist valuably when the dialogue came alive with character and force."

The Bulletin said William Sterling is   perhaps   the   most distinctive   and   stylistic   producer   in  Australian   television. In   each   of   his shows   he   rarely   misses   an   opportunity  for   adventurous   experiment   with   lighting  or   camera-angles."

References

External links
 A Man for All Seasons at IMDb

Australian drama television films
Films about lawyers
Australian films based on plays
Films directed by William Sterling (director)